Rachel Marjorie Joan Whetstone (born 22 February 1968) is a British public relations executive. Whetstone was in charge of communications and public policy for Google for nearly 10 years. She was senior vice-president of communications and public policy for Uber until April 2017. She then joined Facebook as VP of communications of its WhatsApp, Instagram and Messenger products. Since August 2018, she has been the chief communication officer (CCO) of Netflix.

In February 2013, Whetstone was assessed as one of the 100 most powerful women in the United Kingdom by Woman's Hour on BBC Radio 4. Whetstone has been featured on PRWeek's Power List several times, most recently in 2016 at number 14.

Early life
Whetstone's maternal grandfather was Antony Fisher, founder of several libertarian think tanks, including the Institute of Economic Affairs and the Atlas Economic Research Foundation. Her mother was Linda Whetstone, who worked with Fisher's think tanks.

Raised in East Sussex, Whetstone attended Benenden School and then read history at the University of Bristol.

Career
Upon graduation she joined Conservative Central Office, advising then-Home Secretary Michael Howard. She subsequently entered the private sector, working for T-Mobile UK and Portland PR, before returning to Westminster in 2003 as Political Secretary to Howard when he became Conservative Party leader.

When Howard stood down following the general election in 2005, she returned to the private sector, joining Google in London before moving to California to lead the search engine's public policy and PR teams.

In June 2015, Whetstone became senior vice-president of policy and communications at Uber, replacing David Plouffe who was to be promoted to chief adviser to the company. In April 2017, it was announced that Whetstone would be leaving Uber. She was replaced by Jill Hazelbaker, who had been Whetstone's deputy.

Recode reported in July 2017 that Whetstone would be joining Facebook in September as VP of communications for WhatsApp, Instagram and Messenger. The newly created role reported to Facebook's VP of Global Communications, Caryn Marooney.

In August 2018, Whetstone joined Netflix to run public relations.

Personal life
Whetstone is married to Steve Hilton. She lives in Atherton, California, the most expensive ZIP code in the United States. In 2022, she opposed a plan to loosen the zoning code of the affluent town (which only allows one house per acre) and permit multifamily housing.

References

External links
Article by Adam Curtis about think tanks, featuring Rachel Whetstone from the BBC

1968 births
Alumni of the University of Bristol
British political consultants
English expatriates in the United States
English public relations people
Netflix people
Facebook employees
Google employees
Living people
People from East Sussex
Conservative Party (UK) officials